ExxonMobil Journalism Award (Prêmio ExxonMobil de Jornalismo), previously known as Esso Journalism Award (Prêmio Esso de Jornalismo), formerly known as Esso Reportage Award (Prêmio Esso de Reportagem), is an annual Brazilian journalism award given by the company Esso in Brazil. The award was created in 1955 by Ney Peixoto do Vale, who took inspiration from the Pulitzer Prize.

The main award is a trophy and R$ 30,000 and goes to paper press only. Other categories are awarded with amounts of money ranging from R$3,000.00 to R$20,000.00, besides certificates. There are national and international categories. The winners are previously selected by a jury of 25 professionals related to the categories and later chosen by an award commission of five people.

Categories and awards 

 Esso Journalism Award - R$30,000.00 + certificate
 Esso Special News Broadcasting Award
 Esso Reportage Award - R$10.000,00 + certificate
 Esso Photography Award - R$10.000,00 + certificate
 Esso Economic Information Award - R$5.000,00 + certificate
 Esso Scientific, Technological and Ecological Information Award - R$5.000,00 + certificate
 Esso Special First Pege Award - R$5.000,00 + certificate
 Esso Graphic Creation Award - newspaper category - R$5.000,00 + certificate
 Esso Graphic Creation Award - magazine category - R$5.000,00 + certificate
 Esso Special Countryside Award - R$5.000,00 + certificate
 North Esso Regional Award - R$3.000,00 + certificate
 Northeast Esso Regional Award - R$3.000,00 + certificate
 Center-west Esso Regional Award - R$3.000,00 + certificate
 Southeast Esso Regional Award - R$3.000,00 + certificate
 South Esso Regional Award - R$3.000,00 + certificate
 Esso Award for Best Contribution to News Broadcasting

References

External links 
 Official website 

Brazilian journalism awards
Awards established in 1955
1955 establishments in Brazil